Deir Rafat, also known as the Shrine of Our Lady Queen of Palestine and of the Holy Land, is a Catholic monastery in central Israel. Located to the north-west of Beit Shemesh, between Givat Shemesh and kibbutz Tzora to the south and Kfar Uria to the north, it falls under the jurisdiction of Mateh Yehuda Regional Council.

History

The monastery was established in 1927 by the Latin Patriarch Luigi Barlassina and contained a boarding school, an orphanage and convent. Currently the convent is running a guest house and a retreat center for believers and Holy Land pilgrims. The façade of the convent church bears the Latin inscription "Reginæ Palæstinæ", lit. "to the Queen of Palestine", and carries a 6-metre statue of the Virgin Mary. The church ceiling is decorated with a painting showing angels carrying banners with the first words of the Hail Mary prayer in 280 languages. Since 2009, the convent is in the care of the female branch of the Catholic order known as "the Monastic Family of Bethlehem, of the Assumption of the Virgin and of Saint Bruno", called the monastic Sisters of Bethlehem.

References

Bibliography

 (pp. 154-5)

 (p. 20)

External links
Survey of Western Palestine, Map 17:  IAA, Wikimedia commons

Roman Catholic monasteries in Israel
Catholicism in Israel
Populated places established in 1927
20th-century Christian monasteries
Populated places in Jerusalem District
Buildings and structures in Jerusalem District
1927 establishments in Mandatory Palestine